Dinajpur Government Girls' High School is a school for girls in Dinajpur Sadar Upazila in Bangladesh. It was established in 1869.

About 2000 students reside here. There are about 52 teachers in this school, meaning about 1 per 38 students. All faculty are well-educated, and the headmaster is an M.A.M. ed.

DGGHS has 4 buildings, one of which is a 3 storied building. There are 36 rooms for the students.

The school is divided into two shifts. One is morning shift and other is a day shift. The morning shift opens at 7a.m. and breaks at 12p.m. The other shift starts at 12:15p.m. and breaks at 4:45p.m.

References 

Schools in Dinajpur District, Bangladesh
Girls' schools in Bangladesh
Educational institutions established in 1859
1859 establishments in India